The Our Lady of Carmel Church is a church located on the island of Taipa, Macau, China.

History
The church was built in 1885 and namesake of Our Lady of Carmel Parish.

Architecture
The church's architectural style Neoclassical, but coloured wall are similar to many historic structures in Macau. The belltower of the church does not have a steeple. The church has 2,000 square feet of space and can hold up to 200.

See also

 Religion in Macau

References

External links 
 Our Lady of Mount Carmel Parish webpage at the website of the Diocese of Macau
 Our Lady of Carmel Church at macautourism.gov.mo

Buildings and structures in Macau
Catholic Church in Macau
Roman Catholic churches in Macau
1885 establishments in China
1885 establishments in the Portuguese Empire
1880s establishments in Macau
Roman Catholic churches completed in 1885
19th-century Roman Catholic church buildings in China
Neoclassical church buildings in China